Andreas Marschall (15 November 1783 – 9 February 1842) was a piano builder. He operated a piano factory in Copenhagen from 1812 and until his death in 1842.

Biography
Marschall was born in Trnava, Hungary. He later worked as a cabinetmaker at various piano factories in Germany.

After moving to Copenhagen in 1810 he initially worked for around a year for instrument maker Peter Christian Uldahl before starting his own piano workshop in 1812. It developed into the leading manufacturer in Denmark of its time. In 1825–26, Marschall installed the country's first hot air-ventilation system to speed up the process of drying the lumber needed for construction of his instruments.

Personal life
On 20 January 1813, Marschall was wed Anna Marie Bagger (29 July 1795 – 19 February 1844) in Trinitatis Church in Copenhagen. He was later hit by decease and died on 9 February 1842 in the psychological hospital in Slesvig. The factory closed in connection with his death.

References 

Danish musical instrument makers
Danish companies established in 1812
Emigrants from the Austrian Empire to Denmark
1783 births
1842 deaths